Kahenge is a village in the Kavango West Region of northern Namibia.

References

Populated places in Kavango West